Scatterbox is an American punk rock band from Coeur d'Alene, Idaho. Formed in 2000, the current lineup includes Tom White (vocals), Scott Rozell (drums), Mark Cogburn (guitar),Ryan White (bass) and Sean Nicol (guitar).  They currently are signed with Blackhouse Records of Spokane, Washington. Scatterbox has released five full-length albums (including one live record), and three EPs, one of which was a split release with the now-defunct Spokane, Washington band, American Zero (whose members went on to join The Lashes, Moral Crux, and Kay Kay and His Weathered Underground). Scatterbox Live: The 20th Anniversary Documentary out November 11th 2022

Past members 
Past members include (all guitarists) Dan Stamper (2000–2002), Jared Brown (2002–2005), Chris Copulos (2003–2005), and Sean Nicol (2005–2009).  Dan Stamper played guitar on the first two Scatterbox releases Run Faster, Jump Higher, and Lipstick Stains and Shotgun Shells.  Shortly after the release of Lipstick Stains..., Stamper left the band, and was replaced by (at the time) American Zero and Moral Crux guitarist Jared Brown.  Brown left the band in 2005 to pursue other interests, and Sean Nicol (Intifada, Hellrods) stepped in. Chris Copulos was added as a second guitarist in 2003 after leaving the band Ghoul.  Copulos left the band in 2006 to move back to his native Chicago, Illinois, and shortly afterwards joined the band Nightcap.  Mark Cogburn joined the band officially on New Year's Day of 2007 and has been noted as a permanent member.  Nicol left the band in 2009 to attend school in Florida and went on to work for Boeing.  And in late 2010, the band added Justin Smith to the lineup.  Jared Brown and Scott Rozell were also members of Lookout! Records band Moral Crux at a point in time.  Brown left the band in 2008, whereas Rozell departed in 2005, rejoined in 2007, and departed again in early 2009.  Jared Brown rejoined in 2015 after Justin Smith's departure to Seattle, Washington. Rozell joined Green Jellÿ (AKA Green Jello) in Summer of 2018 as a touring drummer.  As of 2019, the band's current lineup consists of the White brothers, Rozell and Cogburn as a four piece, and are in the process of writing new material for a new album with a release date to be determined.

Release history 
The first three Scatterbox releases were self-released on the band's own imprint, Blackhouse Records.  In 2004, the band signed with Clickpop Records, making the newest album Sudden Movements the first Scatterbox record to have national and international distribution.  The previous records are, however, harder to find currently on physical format.  The discography is however available on digital format.

Scatterbox has appeared on many compilations with bands such as DEK, The Dillinger Escape Plan, Against All Authority, Morrissey, Citizen Fish, MDC, Destruction Made Simple, The Dresden Dolls, and others.  In 2006, the song "Sensitive" from the 2003 album Infection III was used on the soundtrack of Poultrygeist: Night of the Chicken Dead from Troma Entertainment alongside the likes of The Dwarves, The Nihilistics, and Thee Obscene.  The song is actually used in the film as well.

The band's newest studio record, titled "Ritual",  was released on October 28, 2014, via Blackhouse Records/T.F. Enterprises. Nick Jarvelin handled the production duties (Android Hero, Sledgeback, The Hollowpoints).

The band went on a lengthy hiatus for over a year due to personal reasons before getting back together and moving forward with more recording, touring, and one-off shows.

2022 Scatterbox Live : The 20th Anniversary documentary release November 11, 2022

Discography 
Run Faster, Jump Higher (2001, Blackhouse)
Lipstick Stains and Shotgun Shells (2002, Blackhouse) Split with American Zero
Infection III (2003, Blackhouse)
Sudden Movements (2005 Clickpop Records)
Enemies (2008 Clickpop Records/Blackhouse)
208: Live at The Knitting Factory (Blackhouse/Amazon) Release Date: August 3, 2010
Ritual (2014, Blackhouse/T.F. Enterprises/Amazon) Release Date: October 28, 2014

References 

American punk rock groups